Colonel John McAusland Denny   (29 November 1858 – 9 December 1922) was a Scottish businessman and Conservative Party politician.

Denny was born in Helenslee, Dumbarton, one of eight sons of Dr. Peter Denny. His grandfather William Denny founded the family shipbuilding firm William Denny and Brothers. He was educated at Dumbarton Academy and in Lausanne and became a shipbuilder and a director of the Lanarkshire and Dumbartonshire Railway company.

He was elected at the 1895 general election as the Member of Parliament (MP) for Kilmarnock Burghs. and re-elected in 1900, holding the seat until standing down at the 1906 general election.

He was a founder member of the Glasgow and West of Scotland Association for Women's Suffrage.

During the First World War, he was chairman of the Dumbartonshire Territorial Force Association, and became an honorary colonel in the Argyll and Sutherland Highlanders, which he was largely responsible for raising. He was made a Companion of the Order of the Bath in the 1917 New Year Honours.

References

External links

1858 births
1922 deaths
People educated at Dumbarton Academy
Members of the Parliament of the United Kingdom for Scottish constituencies
Companions of the Order of the Bath
UK MPs 1895–1900
UK MPs 1900–1906
Scottish suffragists